Lasse Torkelson Trædal (20 December 1857 – 14 October 1924) was a Norwegian farmer, schoolteacher and politician for the Liberal Party.

He was born in Lavik and was a member of Lavik municipal council from 1895 to 1913, serving as mayor. He was elected to the Parliament of Norway from Nordre Bergenhus Amt in 1900, and after a hiatus he won re-elections in 1909, 1912 and 1915.

References

1857 births
1924 deaths
People from Høyanger
Norwegian schoolteachers
Norwegian farmers
Mayors of places in Sogn og Fjordane
Members of the Storting
Liberal Party (Norway) politicians